Mohamed Khider Airport or Biskra Ouakda Airport  is an airport in Algeria, located approximately 12 km north-northeast of Oumache; about 200 km south-southwest of Constantine.

History
During World War II, the airport was known as "Biskra Airfield".  It was a major United States Twelfth Air Force base of operations during the North African campaign against the German Afrika Korps.  Known combat units assigned to the airfield were: 97th Bombardment Group B-17 Flying Fortress (14 December 1942 – 8 February 1943); 301st Bombardment Group B-17 Flying Fortress (16 December 1942 – 17 January 1943); 1st Fighter Group P-38 Lightning (24 December 1942 – 8 February 1943); HQ, 5th Bombardment Wing (January–March 1943).

Airlines and destinations

See also
List of airports in Algeria
Boeing B-17 Flying Fortress Units of the Mediterranean Theater of Operations

References

External links 
 
 
 Etablissement de Gestion de Services Aéroportuaires d’Alger (EGSA Alger)

Airports in Algeria
Airfields of the United States Army Air Forces in Algeria
World War II airfields in Algeria
Buildings and structures in Biskra Province